Isthmus of Korea is an area of the Korean Peninsula between Korea Bay and East Korea Bay (DPRK), where the peninsula narrows to 160 km. In the west and the east are low plains, while the central part has the wooded mountain range Puktae-bong, with elevations to 1,833 m.

References

Further reading 
 Корейский перешеек // Большая советская энциклопедия : [в 30 т.] / гл. ред. А. М. Прохоров. — 3-е изд. — М. : Советская энциклопедия, 1969–1978. 
 Корейский перешеек // Словарь современных географических названий. — Екатеринбург: У-Фактория. Под общей редакцией акад. В. М. Котлякова. 2006. 

North Korea
Landforms of North Korea